Dichotomophthora is a genus of fungi belonging to the family Pleosporaceae.

Species:

Dichotomophthora basellae
Dichotomophthora brunnea
Dichotomophthora cactacearum
Dichotomophthora indica
Dichotomophthora lutea
Dichotomophthora portulacae
Dichotomophthora portulacae
Dichotomophthora portulacae

References

Pleosporaceae
Dothideomycetes genera